Sarah Gough Adamson, later Sarah Gough Walker, (1888–1963) was a British artist. Although she was born in Manchester, Gough established her reputation as a landscape painter in Scotland.

Biography
Adamson was born in Manchester where her father, Robert Adamson was a professor of philosophy. Adamson studied at the Edinburgh College of Art before she moved to London, some time around 1915. Before leaving Scotland, Adamson was a regular exhibitor at the Royal Scottish Academy, showing some 29 pictures, including watercolours and gouache pieces, there between 1911 and 1915. During her career she also exhibited at the Royal Academy in London, with the Royal Glasgow Institute of the Fine Arts and at the Aberdeen Artists' Society. In Paris, Adamson exhibited at the Salon des Artistes Francais in 1913 and in 1924 she won a silver medal at the Decorative Arts Exhibition in Paris.

References

1888 births
1963 deaths
20th-century English painters
20th-century English women artists
Alumni of the Edinburgh College of Art
Artists from Manchester
English women painters